= Playa de la Ribera =

Beach in Ceuta, Spain

Coordinates: 35°53′13″N 5°18′55″W

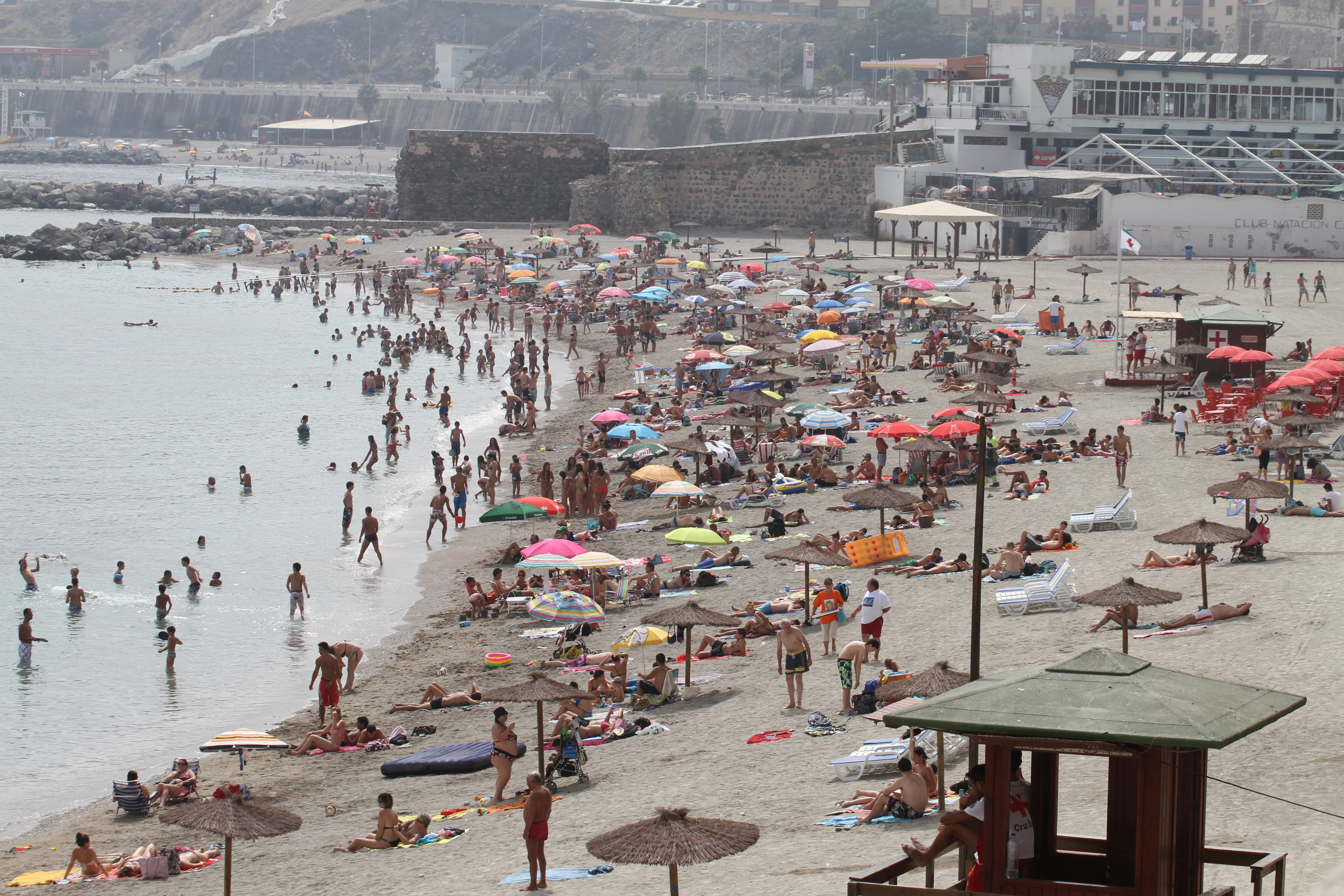
Playa de la Ribera in the summer

Playa de la Ribera is a beach of Ceuta, a Spanish city bordering northern Morocco. Like the Playa del Chorillo, it lies to the south of the isthmus but on the part where it joins the mainland. It is about 405 metres long, with an average width of 40 metres. It is very busy during the summer months.
