= Playa del Chorrillo =

Beach in Ceuta, Spain

Coordinates: 35°51′1″N 5°19′25″W

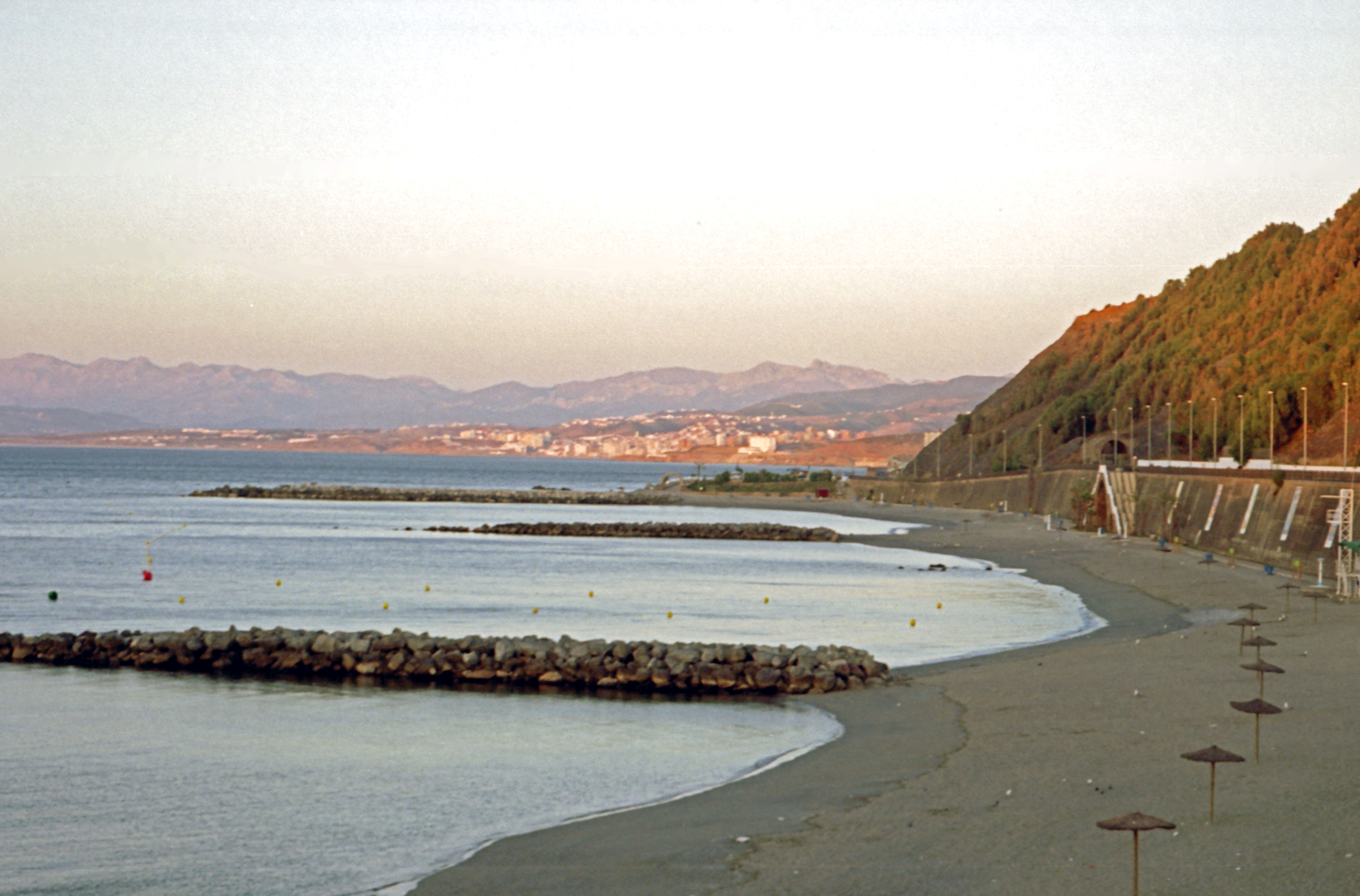
Playa del Chorillo with Morocco in the distance

Playa del Chorrillo is a beach of Ceuta, a Spanish city bordering northern Morocco. Like the Playa de la Ribera, it lies to the south of the isthmus. It has a length of about 1200 metres and average width of 30 metres, with black sand.
